Elections to Tamworth Borough Council were held on 1 May 2003. One third of the council was up for election and the Labour Party stayed in overall control of the council. Overall turnout was 23.2%

After the election, the composition of the council was:
Labour 18
Conservative 11
Independent 1

Election result

Ward results

References
2003 Tamworth election result
Ward results

2003
2003 English local elections
2000s in Staffordshire